Lyndon Brook (10 April 1926 – 9 January 2004) was a British actor, on film and television.

Family and early life 
Lyndon Brook was born on 10 April 1926 in Los Angeles, California, to British parents. He came from an established acting family: his father, Clive Brook, had been a star of the silent movies and had moved to Hollywood to play quintessential Englishmen in a host of films. His parents sent their son back to England to be educated at Stowe School, and he subsequently gained stage experience at Cambridge University. His elder sister, Faith, also became an actress.

Career
In 1949, Brook was given a minor part in the film Train of Events, which starred Valerie Hobson (the future Mrs John Profumo) and John Clements.

In 1951 he was asked by Laurence Olivier to join his company at the St James's Theatre, London, in Shakespeare's Anthony and Cleopatra and George Bernard Shaw's Caesar and Cleopatra. The double production was set up to celebrate the Festival of Britain. It was whilst appearing in these productions that he met his future wife, the actress Elizabeth Kentish.

In 1954 he played an impressionable navigator opposite Gregory Peck in The Purple Plain. The film was set during the Burma campaign and involved a lengthy trek through the jungle. It enjoyed a huge success at the box office. Two years later, Brook co-starred with Kenneth More in one of the most popular of all Second World War dramas, Reach for the Sky.

He appeared with Michael Hordern and Dirk Bogarde in The Spanish Gardener (1956), and as Richard Wagner opposite Bogarde's Franz Liszt in Song Without End (1960).

Thereafter, Brook became a regular in many popular television dramas. He appeared in I, Claudius; three times in The Avengers and The New Avengers; and one appearance in Crown Court (TV series), ('The Getaway' episode, in 1974). He also played George VI alongside Timothy West's Winston Churchill in the BBC's Churchill and the Generals (1979). His later film roles in the 1970s and 1980s included The Hireling, Plenty and Defence of the Realm.

Brook was a much published author and scripted the 1957 television series Love Her to Death with Peter Wyngarde in the leading role.

Death 
Brook died in London on 9 January 2004.

Filmography

References

External links

Obituary in The Guardian
Obituary in The Stage

1926 births
2004 deaths
Alumni of the University of Cambridge
English male film actors
English male television actors
English male stage actors
Male actors from London
20th-century English male actors
People educated at Stowe School